Eurasian cave lion may refer to:
 Panthera leo fossilis, the Middle Pleistocene Eurasian cave lion
 Panthera spelaea, the Late Pleistocene Eurasian cave lion

Animal common name disambiguation pages